Jazmín Enrigue Abundis (born 9 May 2000) is a Mexican professional football defender who plays for UANL of the Liga MX Femenil.

Honours and achievements

Club
UANL
Liga MX Femenil: Clausura 2018
Liga MX Femenil: Clausura 2019

Individual
 Liga MX Femenil Team of The Season: Apertura 2017

References

External links
 
 

2000 births
Living people
Mexican women's footballers
Footballers from Guadalajara, Jalisco
Liga MX Femenil players
Tigres UANL (women) footballers
Women's association football defenders
Mexican footballers